Dominican amber is amber from the Dominican Republic derived from resin of the extinct tree Hymenaea protera.

Dominican amber differentiates itself from Baltic amber by being nearly always transparent, and it has a higher number of fossil inclusions. This has enabled the detailed reconstruction of the ecosystem of a long-vanished tropical forest.

Age 

A study in the early 1990s returned a date up to 40 million years old. However, according to Poinar, Dominican amber dates from Oligocene to Miocene, thus about 25 million years old. The oldest, and hardest of this amber comes from the mountain region north of Santiago. The La Cumbre, La Toca, Palo Quemado, La Bucara, and Los Cacaos mining sites in the Cordillera Septentrional not far from Santiago. Amber has also been found in the south-eastern Bayaguana/Sabana de la Mar area. There is also subfossil copal found in the Cotui deposits with an age of less than 280 years.

Mining sites 
There are three main sites in the Dominican Republic where amber is found: La Cordillera Septentrional, in the north, and Bayaguana and Sabana de la Mar, in the east. In the northern area, the amber-bearing unit is formed of clastic rocks, washed down with sandstone fragments and other sediments that accumulated in a deltaic environment, even in water of some depth.

In the eastern area, the amber is found in a sediment formation of organic-rich laminated sand, sandy clay, intercalated lignite, and as well as some solvated beds of gravel and calcarenite.

Both areas seem to have been part of the same sedimentary basin but were later disrupted by movements along major faults.

Mining 

Dominican amber, especially Dominican blue amber, is mined through bell pitting, which is extremely dangerous. The bell pit is basically a foxhole dug with whatever tools are available. Machetes do the start, some shovels, picks and hammers may participate eventually. The pit itself goes as deep or safe as possible, sometimes vertical, sometimes horizontal, but never level. It snakes into hill sides, drops away, joins up with others, goes straight up and pops out elsewhere. 'Foxhole' applies indeed: rarely are the pits large enough to stand in, and then only at the entrance. Miners crawl around on their knees using short-handled picks, shovels and machetes.

There are little to no safety measures. A pillar or so may hold back the ceiling from time to time but only if the area has previously collapsed. Candles are the only source of light. Humidity inside the mines is at 100%. Since the holes are situated high on mountainsides and deep inside said mountains, the temperature is cool and bearable, but after several hours the air becomes stale. During rain the mines are forced to close. The holes fill up quickly with water, and there is little point in pumping it out again (although sometimes this is done) because the unsecured walls may crumble.

Variations 
Dominican amber can be found in many colors, besides the obvious amber. Yellow and honey colored are fairly common. There is also red and green in smaller quantities and the rare blue amber (fluorescent).

The blue amber reportedly is found mostly in Palo Quemado mine south from La Cumbre.

The Museo del Ambar Dominicano, in Puerto Plata, as well as the Amber World Museum in Santo Domingo have collections of amber specimens.

Paleobiology
Numerous organisms have been described from amber specimens including:

Protozoans
Paleoleishmania neotropicum
Trypanosoma antiquus

Flora
Discoflorus neotropicus
Hymenaea protera
Palaeoraphe
Roystonea palaea

Funga
Parmelia ambra

Fauna

Acanthostichus hispaniolicus
Anelaphus velteni
Anochetus ambiguus
Anochetus brevidentatus
Anochetus conisquamis
Anochetus corayi 
Anochetus dubius
Anochetus exstinctus
Anochetus intermedius
Anochetus lucidus
Apterostigma electropilosum 
Apterostigma eowilsoni
Araneagryllus
Augochlora leptoloba
Azteca alpha
Azteca eumeces
Cephalotes jansei
Dicromantispa electromexicana
Dicromantispa moronei
Eickwortapis
Electromyrmococcus
Elaphidion inclusum
Elaphidion tocanum
Formicodiplogaster myrmenema
Leptofoenus pittfieldae
Lutzomyia adiketis
Neocorynura electra
Nesagapostemon
cf. Nesoctites 
Odontomachus pseudobauri
Odontomachus spinifer
Oligochlora
Palaeoplethodon
Paradoryphoribius
Plectromerus grimaldii
Plectromerus tertiarius
Pterolophosoma otiliae
Sphaerodactylus dommeli
Stizocera evanescens
Syndesus ambericus 
Tainosia
Termitaradus mitnicki
Triatoma dominicana

See also 
 Lagerstätte
 Japanese amber

References

External links 

Ambercollector.info: Dominican Amber 
Ambarazul.com: The Definitive List of Dominican Blue Amber Mines
Palaeo.uk:  "Geological setting and age of the Dominican Republic" — by Christine Lipkin.
PBS NOVA: "Amber: Jewel of the Earth"
ISEM Research: Anolis lizard in amber
American Museum of Natural History: "Amber: Window to the Past" (1998)
Emporia.edu: Life in Amber  — includes numerous other links.

 
Miocene life of North America
Oligocene life of North America
Dominican Republic culture